The legal working age is the minimum age required by law for a person to work, in each country or jurisdiction, if they have not reached the age of majority. Activities that are dangerous, harmful to the health or that may affect the morals of minors fall into this category.

Africa

Americas

Asia

Europe

Oceania

See also
 Child labour
 Critique of work
 Index of youth rights-related articles
 Minimum Age Convention, 1973
 School leaving age
Youth
Youth suffrage
Youth rights
Age of candidacy

References

Employment
Minimum ages
Labour law